All of Life in One Night (Italian: Tutta la vita in una notte) is a 1938 Italian drama film directed by Corrado D'Errico and starring Luisa Ferida, Camillo Pilotto and Mino Doro.

It was made at the Pisorno Studios in Tirrenia. The film's sets were designed by Salvo D'Angelo.

Main cast
 Luisa Ferida as Maria  
 Camillo Pilotto as Francesco  
 Mino Doro as Giorgio  
 Germana Paolieri as Giulia  
  as Vinny  
 Umberto Sacripante as Walter  
 Fausto Guerzoni as Tramontana  
 Guglielmo Sinaz as Zanis
 
 Carla Fatarella
 
 Jucci Kellermann
 Nais Lago
 Ferruccio Manzetti
 Livia Minelli
 Renato Navarrini
 
 Yvonne Sandner
 Edda Soligo

References

Bibliography 
 Enrico Lancia. Dizionario del cinema italiano: Dal 1930 al 1944. Gremese Editore, 2005.

External links 
 

1938 drama films
Italian drama films
1938 films
1930s Italian-language films
Films directed by Corrado D'Errico
Films shot at Tirrenia Studios
Italian black-and-white films
1930s Italian films